Frank Warren Saker (August 10, 1907 in Toronto – April 6, 1980) was a Canadian flatwater canoeist who competed in the 1930s.

At the 1936 Summer Olympics in Berlin, he won two medals with Harvey Charters with a silver in the C-2 10000 m and a bronze in the C-2 1000 m events.

External links 
 
 

1907 births
1980 deaths
Canoeists from Toronto
Canadian male canoeists
Canoeists at the 1936 Summer Olympics
Olympic canoeists of Canada
Olympic silver medalists for Canada
Olympic bronze medalists for Canada
Olympic medalists in canoeing
Medalists at the 1936 Summer Olympics